Halil Kaya (born 1920, date of death unknown) was a Turkish sport wrestler. He won a bronze medal in Greco-Roman wrestling, bantamweight class, at the 1948 Summer Olympics in London.

References

External links

1920 births
Year of death missing
Wrestlers at the 1948 Summer Olympics
Turkish male sport wrestlers
Olympic wrestlers of Turkey
Olympic bronze medalists for Turkey
Olympic medalists in wrestling
Medalists at the 1948 Summer Olympics
20th-century Turkish people